, literally: "Blue Sky Angel", is a 1950 Japanese black-and-white film directed by Torajiro Saito.

Cast 
 Hibari Misora

See also
 List of films in the public domain in the United States

References

External links 
 

Japanese black-and-white films
1950 films
Films directed by Torajiro Saito
1950s Japanese films